Hillcrest Terrace is an unincorporated community in Ohio Township, Warrick County, in the U.S. state of Indiana.

It is located within the city limits of Newburgh.

Geography

References

Unincorporated communities in Warrick County, Indiana
Unincorporated communities in Indiana